Théo Van Rooy (born 2 October 1934) is a Belgian footballer. He played in four matches for the Belgium national football team in 1957.

References

External links
 

1934 births
Living people
Belgian footballers
Belgium international footballers
Place of birth missing (living people)
Association footballers not categorized by position